Water's Edge may refer to:

Water's Edge,  a song by Seven Mary Three 
Water's Edge, Barton upon Humber, a water park
Water's Edge Festival a music festival held  in Coquitlam, British Columbia
Wolgwang Water's Edge Park park that is located in Daegu Dalseo-gu, South Korea
Unamji Water's Edge Park park that is located in Daegu Buk-gu, South Korea
 A concept in Tax consolidation

See also
Waters Edge